Pheidole templaria is a species of ant in the subfamily Myrmicinae.

Subspecies
Pheidole templaria euscrobata Forel, 1913 - India
Pheidole templaria templaria Forel, 1902 - Sri Lanka

References

External links

 at antwiki.org
Animaldiversity.org
Itis.org

templaria
Hymenoptera of Asia
Insects described in 1902